Elias Howell (August 17, 1785May 12, 1844) was a one-term United States Representative from Ohio from 1835 to 1837.

Born in New Jersey in 1785, he attended the public schools and in 1819 moved to Newark, Ohio. He was a member of the Ohio Senate from 1830 to 1832 and was elected as an Anti-Jacksonian to the Twenty-fourth United States Congress, serving from March 4, 1835, to March 3, 1837. He was not a candidate for renomination, and died near Newark, Ohio in 1844.
Howell's son, James Bruen Howell, was a U.S. Senator from Iowa.

References

1785 births
1844 deaths
Ohio state senators
People from New Jersey
Politicians from Newark, Ohio
American people of Welsh descent
19th-century American politicians
National Republican Party members of the United States House of Representatives from Ohio